The Ministry of Fluxus is an inclusive, publicly accessible art project in Lithuania.

The "Ministry of Fluxus", or FxM, was established on 23 April 2010 in Vilnius, the capital of Lithuania. The FxM Project began in an abandoned medical building on Gediminas Avenue in Vilnius, but it is currently housed in a former shoe factory in Kaunas, Lithuania's second city by size.

The Ministry turns abandoned buildings into publicly accessible studio, performance and exhibition space. Participating artists need only check with organizers to ensure that there is space for them. Most events hosted at the FxM are free. The project's open and accessible structure make it an excellent atmosphere for artistic collaboration.

The project began as a celebration of the Fluxus art movement. The Fluxus movement began in the 1960s and 1970s in the U.S. and later spread to the rest of the world. It opposed the commercialization of art and its domination by an elite caste of self-important artists. One of the movement's main initiators was Jurgis Mačiūnas, a Lithuanian-American artist who brought together a group of international artists to create collaboratively. Mačiūnas was pivotal in forming and implementing the movement's goals. Other significant participants included Yoko Ono and Jonas Mekas. One excellent example of their accomplishments is the revitalization of New York's SoHo neighborhood in the 1970s. By repurposing old, abandoned manufacturing spaces as studios, artists turned urban blight into productive artistic spaces.

External links
 
 George Maciunas
 Jonas Mekas
 Fluxus

Cultural organizations based in Lithuania
Fluxus